Hornell Armory is a historic National Guard armory building located at Hornell in Steuben County, New York. It is a brick and stone castle-like structure built in 1894. It was designed by architect Isaac G. Perry. The three-story main structure has a four-story round corner tower.  Attached to the main structure are an additional pair of two-story corner towers.  Extending from the main structure is a long two-story wing with a gable roof and corner stair tower.

It was listed on the National Register of Historic Places in 1980.

References

Armories on the National Register of Historic Places in New York (state)
Infrastructure completed in 1894
Buildings and structures in Steuben County, New York
National Register of Historic Places in Steuben County, New York
Hornell, New York